Raspopović is Serbian surname, derived from raspop ("ex-priest"). It may refer to:

Savo Raspopović, Montenegrin guerilla militia leader
Milan Raspopović, Serbian professor
Nikola Raspopović (born 1989), Serbian footballer
Momčilo Raspopović, Montenegrin footballer

See also
Raspopov

Serbian surnames